Sab-e Agotay, also rendered as Sab-e Gota or Soba Geta or Sab-e Gata, may refer to:
 Sab-e Agotay-e Olya
 Sab-e Agotay-e Sofla